This is a list of notable applications (apps) that run on the Android platform which meet guidelines for free software and open-source software.

Advertisement blocking

Web browsers

Office Suites and synchronisation

Communication

Privacy/security focused

Emulators

Games

General

Health

Multimedia

Navigation

Reading

Science and education

Security

System and utilities

Notes

See also

 List of free and open-source software packages
 List of open-source mobile phones
 List of open-source hardware projects
 Free Software Directory
 List of open-source hardware
 Replicant (operating system)
 LineageOS
 Guardian Project

References

External links
There are a number of third-party maintained lists of open-source Android applications, including:
 Android Open Source resources and software database
 F-Droid Repository of free and open-source Android software
 PRISM Break – curated list of security focused open-source alternatives to mitigate some threats of PRISM, XKeyscore and Tempora.
 Droid-Break – curated list of general purpose open-source alternatives. Inspired by PRISM-break.
 Free Software Directory – community-maintained directory of Free and Open-source software

 
Android applications
Android applications
Google lists
Lists of mobile apps